Love Killah is Taiwanese Mandopop boyband SpeXial's first Mandarin extended play (EP+DVD). The "Fan Meeting Pre-Order Edition" was pre-ordered from 21 January 2015. The first edition "Deluxe Edition" was released on February 4, and the second edition "Fan Meeting Live Edition" was released on March 24.

Having added three more members since its last release, this new EP features as its title track, a high-energy electronic dance tune. The second promotional single, "Missing U", received over 60 thousand votes and ranked No.1 on "TVBS Global Chinese Music" for seven weeks.

A DVD containing making-of footage is included in all three editions. In addition, "Deluxe Edition" includes a 76-page photo album, while "Fan Meeting Live Edition" includes a 32-page lyrics booklet, a bonus DVD containing footage from SpeXial's 7 February 2015 fan meeting at National Taiwan University Sports Center and photo cards with members' messages printed on the back.

Track listing

Music videos

References

External links
 SpeXial 2015 DVD+EP 影音迷你專輯《Love Killah》【超親密FAN MEETING限量版】| 華納線上音樂雜誌
 SpeXial 2015 DVD+EP 影音迷你專輯《Love Killah》Fan Meeting Live直擊影音珍藏版 | 華納線上音樂雜誌

2015 albums
SpeXial albums